The 2010 Yemeni President Cup was the 13th edition of the Yemeni President Cup.

The cup winner were guaranteed a place in the 2011 AFC Cup.

First round
First legs: May 27–June 11; Second legs: June 7–15

|}

Second round
First legs: June 16–18; Second legs: June 20–22

|}

Quarterfinals
First legs: June 23–25; Second legs: June 26–28

|}

Semifinals
First legs: July 1–2; Second legs: July 6

|}

Final

References
RSSSF.com
Soccerway.com

Yemeni President Cup
Pres